The Extraordinary and Plenipotentiary Ambassador of Peru to the Socialist Republic of Vietnam is the official representative of the Republic of Peru to the Socialist Republic of Vietnam.

Peru first recognized South Vietnam during the era of a divided Vietnam. This recognition continued even after the establishment of Juan Velasco Alvarado's left-leaning Revolutionary Government. After the country's collapse and succession by a puppet government and eventually its northern counterpart, Peru only reestablished relations with the new Vietnamese state in 1994.

A Peruvian embassy was opened in Hanoi in 2015. The resident ambassador is accredited to neighbouring Laos.

List of representatives

See also
List of ambassadors of Peru to Thailand

References

Vietnam
Peru